Onur Aydın may refer to:

 Onur Aydın (basketball) (born 1979), Turkish basketball player
 Onur Aydın (footballer) (born 1988), Turkish footballer